José Barreiro (born 16 March 1920) is an Argentine former football player and coach.

Career
Barreiro started his career in 1941 with Chacarita Juniors in the Primera B. After one season they were promoted to the top flight. In 1944–1945 he transferred to Racing Club but returned to Chacarita in 1946. After two seasons he went on to play for Estudiantes. In 1951 he scored two goals in the legendary 7-0 victory against CA Vélez Sarsfield. He ended his career where it started, with Chacarita.

In 1957 Barreiro became manager for San Lorenzo de Almagro and became champion with the team in 1959. Together with Victorio Spinetto and José Della Torre he led the national team in 1959 to the victory of the Copa América. In 1960, he reached the semifinals of the Copa Libertadores. After this he left San Lorenzo, but returned to the club in 1963–1964, where he promoted a group of young players that became known as  Los Carasuscias, and 1966–1967, leaving the foundation of the team that won the championship in 1968. He became a club icon.

References

External links
 José Barreiro
 

1920 births
Possibly living people
Argentine footballers
Argentine football managers
Chacarita Juniors footballers
Racing Club de Avellaneda footballers
Estudiantes de La Plata footballers
San Lorenzo de Almagro managers
Association football midfielders
Footballers from Buenos Aires
Club Atlético Tigre managers